Sonchus kirkii, also known as New Zealand sow thistle, or shore puha is a herb in the Asteraceae family. It grows in coastal New Zealand.

Appearance
The shore puha has green leaves extending upwards with spiky sides. On the top is a yellow flower. The shore puha can grow up to 15-30 centimeters tall. Occasionally it grows up to 100 centimeters.

Conservation status
The conservation status of the shore puha is currently at "declining" and its umbrella category is "at risk".

Threats
Other species of weeds that grow faster may be the reason for the shore puha to be at a declining status as it is outcompeted. The sowthistles Sonchus asper and Sonchus oleraceus can take over the habitats that the shore puha prefer and colonizing the area quicker. Up until the mid-1980s the shore puha was common, but since then its numbers have been declining.

Other names
pūhā
puha
puwha (Māori)
raurōroa

Gallery

References

kirkii
Flora of New Zealand